The Chevrolet Yeoman was a station wagon produced by Chevrolet for the 1958 model year. The Yeoman was available in two models, a two-door and a four-door, both with six-passenger seating capacity. Based on the Delray passenger car series, the Yeoman represented the entry-level selections in the 1958 Chevrolet station wagon lineup, which also included the Brookwood and the Nomad.

Design
For 1958, Chevrolet models were redesigned longer, lower, and heavier than their 1957 predecessors.
Chevrolet's design for the year fared better than its other GM offerings, and lacked the overabundance of chrome found on Pontiacs, Oldsmobiles, Buicks and Cadillacs. Complementing Chevrolet's front design was a broad grille and quad headlights that helped simulate a 'Baby Cadillac'; the wagon's tail received a fan-shaped alcove on both side panels, similar to the sedan's, but wagons housed single tail lights instead of dual (triple on Impala) to accommodate the tailgate.

Despite being a recession year, sales increased and overtook Ford, which held the top position in 1957) and the Bel Air the most popular Chevrolet model. The Nomad station wagon name also reappeared in 1958 when the vehicle became as the premium four-door Chevrolet station wagon, rather than the two-door designs of the 1955-57 Nomads.

A new dash was used. The value of a drag coefficient for 1958 Chevy wagons is estimated by a-c, is Cd = 0.6. The Delray-based Yeoman was the lowest version and featured minimal interior and exterior trim and limited options.

Safety

The Yeoman featured Chevrolet's new "Safety-Girder" cruciform frame. Similar in layout to the frame adopted for the 1957 Cadillac, it featured box-section side rails and a boxed front cross member that bowed under the engine, these "x-frames" were used on other 1958 to 1964 Chevys, as well as Cadillac. The rear was tied together by a channel-section cross member.  This design was later criticized as providing less protection in the event of a side impact collision, but would persevere until 1965.

Engines
 Blue Flame straight six
  to  Turbo Fire small block V8
  to  W-series Turbo Thrust big block V8

2 door wagons

Of the 187,000 1958 Chevrolet wagons built, only 16,590 of these were 2-door model Yeoman (not counting Delray Sedan Delivery), Chevrolet’s entry-level wagon. 

The Yeoman was dropped (along with the Delray) at the end of 1958. For 1959, Chevrolet's Brookwood would now offer a 2-door wagon and become the lowest priced station wagon.

Chevrolet's two other wagon lines, the mid-range Brookwood and top-trimmed Nomad were available only as 4-door wagons for 1958.

Notes

Yeoman
Station wagons
Full-size vehicles
Rear-wheel-drive vehicles
1950s cars
Motor vehicles manufactured in the United States